Matthew Faber (January 31, 1973 – March 28, 2020) was an American actor best known for his roles in films and television series such as Welcome to the Dollhouse, Natural Born Killers, Law & Order  and Palindromes.

Faber died at his Van Nuys, Los Angeles home at the age of 47 of natural causes.

Filmography

Darrow (as Henry Coll)
Bob Roberts (as Calvin)
Fresh (as Long Hair Teenager)
Natural Born Killers (as Kid #1)
Stonewall (as Mizz Moxie)
Welcome to the Dollhouse (as Mark Wiener)
Law & Order (as Scott Wilder, 1 episode)
A Little Tenderness (as Pete)
The Pallbearer (as Jared)
Sue (as Sven)
L.A. Without a Map (as Joel)
Sugar: The Fall of the West
Restless (as Ben Gold)
Ride with the Devil (as Turner Rawls)
Hard Luck (as Eric Billings)
Palindromes (as Mark Wiener)
The Devil You Know (as Harry)

References

External links

American male film actors
American male television actors
2020 deaths
21st-century American male actors
1973 births